Martinlaakso railway station is a Helsinki commuter rail station located in Vantaa, Finland.

The station is served by circular lines I and P, and is between the stations of Louhela and Vantaankoski.

There is an island platform; one side for northbound and another side for southbound trains. There is one lift and a waiting room, although it is not possible to buy tickets from the station. The local bus station is situated nearby.

Prior to the construction of the station at Vantaankoski in 1991, Martinlaakso was the northern terminus for the M line (hence the name of the line).

A shopping center was built next to the station in 2011.

References 

Railway stations in Vantaa
Railway stations opened in 1975